The canton of Valensole is an administrative division in southeastern France. At the French canton reorganisation which came into effect in March 2015, the canton was expanded from 4 to 10 communes:
Allemagne-en-Provence 
Brunet
Esparron-de-Verdon 
Gréoux-les-Bains
Montagnac-Montpezat 
Quinson 
Sainte-Croix-du-Verdon 
Saint-Laurent-du-Verdon 
Saint-Martin-de-Brômes
Valensole

Demographics

See also
Cantons of the Alpes-de-Haute-Provence department 
Communes of France

References

Cantons of Alpes-de-Haute-Provence